The National Association of Electrical Distributors (NAED) is a trade association for the American electrical equipment distribution industry. NAED is a 501(c)6 non-profit organization dedicated to serving and protecting the electrical distribution channel.

General 
NAED provides networking opportunities through approximately 20 meetings & conferences a year, training and research through the NAED Education & Research Foundation, industry information and research through TED Magazine. The year 2008 marks the association's 100th anniversary.

The Structure of NAED 
NAED has three membership categories: distributor member, associate member and allied partners. A company must be an electrical distributor and meet NAED membership requirements. To become an NAED associate member, a company must be a manufacturer or value-added reseller. To become an NAED allied partner a company must be a marketing group, service or technology organization and must meet NAED criteria.

The Electrical Distribution Market 

*Electrical  Distribution is estimated to be a $72 billion industry.

Total number of locations of NAED Members: 4,263
Total number of employees in NAED member companies: about 75,000 distributor employees
Average NAED member’s sales volume: $78,816,300
Median NAED member’s sales volume: $13,226,865
40.4% of NAED members have a sales volume under $10 million

Source: NAED database, April 2007

Foundation 
NAED also runs an Education and Research Foundation. The Foundation provides information and educational resources for distributors, manufacturers, and customers in the electrical distribution industry.

References

External links
 NAED
 The Electrical Distributor Magazine
 National Electrical Manufacturers Association (NEMA)
 Free Access to the 2014 online edition of the National Electric Code

Energy in the United States
Electric power in the United States
Electrical trades organizations
Electrical wiring
Trade associations based in the United States
Organizations established in 1908
1908 establishments in the United States
Communications and media organizations based in the United States
Companies based in San Francisco